Prikubansky is a rural locality (a settlement) in Takhtamukayskoye Rural Settlement of Takhtamukaysky District, the Republic of Adygea, Russia. The population was 1126 as of 2018. There are 9 streets.

Geography 
Prikubansky is located 9 km northeast of Takhtamukay (the district's administrative centre) by road. Takhtamukay is the nearest rural locality.

References 

Rural localities in Takhtamukaysky District